Killadelphia is a slang reference to the city of Philadelphia's high murder rate.  It may also refer to:

 Killadelphia (album), a 2004 album by Lamb of God
 Killadelphia (video album), a 2005 DVD by Lamb of God
 Killadelphia: More Bodies than Days, a 2007 mixtape by rapper Young Chris